Gilbertiodendron dewevrei is a species of tree in the family Fabaceae, native to tropical rain forests in Central Africa. It is often the dominant tree species of the Guineo-Congolian rainforest. The timber is traded as limbali, and is used for construction, flooring and railway sleepers. It is also used for making boats, furniture, tool handles and joinery and for making charcoal.

Description
The crown is dense and allows little light through. The bark is rough, greyish-brown or yellowish brown, peeling off in large flakes. The leaves are pendulous and leathery, the underside being covered with papillae, and they often have a few glands near the margins. They are alternate and pinnate with two to five pairs of leaflets. Each leaflet is ovate or elliptical, the lower leaflets being smaller than the terminal ones; they have rounded or cordate bases and obtuse apices.

The inflorescence is a loose terminal or axillary panicle clad with red hairs, the individual flowers being fragrant and having parts in fives. The sepals are purplish-red and fused at the base. The petals are unequal, one being deeply two-lobed and red, while the remainder are lanceolate.

Distribution and habitat
Gilbertiodendron dewevrei is native to tropical forests in Central Africa, its range including Nigeria, Cameroon, Central African Republic, the Democratic Republic of the Congo, Equatorial Guinea, Gabon, the Republic of the Congo and northern Angola. It often grows in nearly pure, single species stands.

Ecology
The seeds of this tree are eaten by various mammals including rodents, pigs, duikers, African buffaloes, elephants, gorillas and humans.
The seeds are spread when the pods split explosively. The tree casts dense shade and this suppresses herbs and undergrowth on the forest floor, but is tolerated by the tree's own seedlings and saplings to the exclusion of other species. However, the pure stands of this tree are very sensitive to habitat disturbance; the felling of trees allows more light to reach the forest floor and the seedlings of G. dewevrei are outperformed by those of other, faster growing species of tree.

This tree has an ectomycorrhizal relationship with fungi that grow on its roots, particularly Pulveroboletus bembae. Several species of comet orchid grow on Gilbertiodendron dewevrei, including Angraecum distichum, Angraecum subulatum, Angraecum aporoides, and Angraecum podochiloides, and on fallen trees and branches, Angraecum gabonense.

Uses
The timber has many uses in construction and building, including ship building, railway sleepers, mine props, flooring, joinery, doors and window frames, agricultural implements, garden furniture, turnery and toys. It is not generally used for cabinet work or firewood, but makes good charcoal.

The seeds contain certain toxic substances which can be removed by treatment. They are used for human consumption but mostly when other foods are scarce, boiled, roasted, ground into flour for making porridge or fermented and wrapped in Megaphrynium macrostachyum leaves, and subsequently roasted. The bark, leaves and sap have uses in herbal medicine, and strips of the inner bark are used to make bands for carrying baskets. In the northeastern Democratic Republic of the Congo, whole huts are constructed from this tree, with the addition of clay; the main supports are made from branches and partitions from smaller branches, tied together with string made from the inner bark, and the roof is thatched with the tree's leaves.

References

Further reading
 

dewevrei
Flora of Cameroon
Flora of the Democratic Republic of the Congo
Flora of Nigeria
Flora of Gabon
Taxa named by Émile Auguste Joseph De Wildeman